Martina Hingis was the defending champion, but chose not to participate that year.

Serena Williams won in the final 6–1, 6–7(7–9), 6–3, against Jennifer Capriati.

Seeds
The top eight seeds received a bye into the second round. 

  Jennifer Capriati (final)
  Justine Henin (quarterfinals)
  Amélie Mauresmo (third round)
  Serena Williams (champion)
  Monica Seles (semifinals)
  Elena Dementieva (third round)
  Amanda Coetzer (third round)
  Magdalena Maleeva (second round)
  Meghann Shaughnessy (quarterfinals)
  Jelena Dokić (third round)
  Sandrine Testud (quarterfinals)
  Arantxa Sánchez Vicario (first round)
  Conchita Martínez (withdrew due to an achilles injury)
  Anke Huber (semifinals)
  Barbara Schett (third round)
  Chanda Rubin (second round, retired due to a sprained ankle)
  Iroda Tulyaganova (first round)

Draw

Finals

Top half

Section 1

Section 2

Bottom half

Section 3

Section 4

External links
Draw and Qualifying draw

Rogers ATandT Cup
2001 Canada Masters and the Rogers AT&T Cup